Mustique Airways is an airline based in Saint Vincent and the Grenadines.

Fleet size

Current fleet
Mustique airways fleet consists of the following aircraft (as of August 2021).

Services and destinations
Mustique airways operate to the following destinations as of August 2021.

Mustique Airways also provides charter services throughout the Eastern Caribbean.

References

External links

Airlines of Saint Vincent and the Grenadines
Airlines formerly banned in the European Union